Lytle Creek may refer to:

Lytle Creek, California, a community in San Bernardino County, California
Lytle Creek (California), a creek in San Bernardino County, California
Lytle Creek (Iowa), a creek in Iowa crossed by the Washington Mill Bridge
Lytle Creek (Ohio), a river in Clinton County, Ohio
Lytle Creek (Oregon), a creek in Crook County, Oregon